Simple Souls is a 1920 American silent drama film produced by Jesse Hampton and distributed through Pathé Exchange. It is based on a 1919 novel of the same name by John Hastings Turner and stars Blanche Sweet. Robert Thornby directed. It is not known whether the film currently survives.

Plot
Based upon a description in a film publication, Molly Shine (Sweet) is a simple girl who likes her books, and lives with a drinking father (Grimwood) and weeping mother (Kelso). One day she meets the young Duke (Meredith) who falls in love with her and marries her, astonishing her parents who do not believe it until they see the marriage certificate. After the marriage she faces the problems of all who marry outside of their class. The Duke's sister Lady Octavia (Lester) tries to snub her at every turn, resulting in Molly's dejection and wish to leave. When an opportunity presents itself, she attempts to escape but fate returns her to her husband in a peculiar but pleasing way.

Cast
Blanche Sweet as Molly Shine
Charles Meredith as Duke of Wynningham
Kate Lester as Lady Octavia
Herbert Standing as Peter Craine
Mayme Kelso as Mrs. Shine
Herbert Grimwood as Samuel Shine

See also
Blanche Sweet filmography

References

External links

 
 

1920 films
1920 drama films
Silent American drama films
American silent feature films
American black-and-white films
Films based on British novels
Films directed by Robert Thornby
American independent films
Pathé Exchange films
1920s independent films
1920s American films